There are three creeks named Catfish Creek in Ontario, Canada:

Catfish Creek in Algoma District, a tributary of the Magpie River that flows into Lake Superior at Wawa
Catfish Creek (Lake Erie, Elgin) in Elgin County, that flows into Lake Erie at Port Bruce
Catfish Creek (Lake Erie, Norfolk) in Norfolk County, a tributary of the Black Creek, which in turn flows into Lake Erie at Port Dover

See also  
List of rivers of Ontario

References

Rivers of Ontario